KMSO (102.5 FM) is a commercial radio station in Missoula, Montana, owned by Sheila Callahan & Friends, Incorporated. KMSO airs a Hot AC music format featuring today's Hot Hits.

History

KUEZ began broadcasting in 1985. The station became KMSO when the call letters became available. MSO is the airport code for Missoula and was appropriate to claim the destination. KMSO is locally owned serving Western Montana. KMSO and sister station KHDV continue to offer live morning shows and local voice tracking throughout the day.

References

External links

Hot adult contemporary radio stations in the United States
Adult top 40 radio stations in the United States
Radio stations established in 1985
MSO
1985 establishments in Montana